Remo Remotti (16 November 1924 – 21 June 2015) was an Italian actor, playwright, artist and poet.

Life and career 
Born in Rome, Remotti lost his father at 12 years old, then after graduating in Law he moved to Perù, where he attended an art school and began painting. Following the bankruptcy of the taxi company he had founded in Perù, seven years later he returned to Italy where he married Maria Luisa Loy, the sister of the director and screenwriter Nanni Loy, and started an activity as a playwright, often also directing and acting his comedy plays. He was later requested by some theatrical companies for character roles, and in the late 1970s he began a proficuous film career as a character actor. A painter and a sculptor, some of his works are exhibited at the Galleria Nazionale d'Arte Moderna. He was also a composer of poems, usually sonnets in Roman dialect.

Selected filmography 

 A mosca cieca (1966) 
 La prova generale (1968)
 Il gabbiano (1977)
 Morte di un operatore (1979)
 The Meadow (1979)
 La terrazza (1980)
 Henry Angst (1980)
 A Leap in the Dark (1980) - Thief
 Masoch (1980) - Grunwald
 The Lady of the Camellias (1981)
 Sweet Dreams (1981) - Sigmund Freud
 La festa perduta (1981)
 The Logic of Emotion (1982)
 Giocare d'azzardo (1982)
 Canto d'amore (1982)
 The Scarlet and the Black (1983) - Rabbi Leoni
 Occhei, occhei (1983)
 Where's Picone? (1984)
 Bianca (1984) - Siro Siri
 A Strange Passion (1984) - Peppo
 Liberté, Égalité, Choucroute (1985)
 Un foro nel parabrezza (1985) - Simic
 Juke box (1985)
 Inganni (1985) 
 Otello (1986) - Brabantio
 Italian Night (1987) - Italo
 Helsinki Napoli All Night Long (1987) - Neapolitan
 Red Wood Pigeon (1989) - Alter ego of coach
 Nulla ci può fermare (1989)
 Lungo il fiume (1989)
 Affetti speciali (1989) - Venditore di patatine
 The Godfather Part III (1990) - Cardinal Sistine
 Stiamo attraversando un brutto periodo (1990)
 Con i piedi per aria (1990)
 To Want to Fly (1991) - The 'Child'
 Hudson Hawk (1991) - Guy on Donkey
 Ladri di futuro (1991)
 Derrick - Caprese in der Stadt (1991) - Caprese
 Miracolo italiano (1994) 
 Il mondo alla rovescia (1995)
 Bits and Pieces (1996) 
 Cuba Libre - Velocipedi ai tropici (1997) - Poet
 Simpatici & antipatici (1998) - Augusto
 Tobia al caffè (2000) - Colonnello
 Caruso, Zero for Conduct (2001) - Stefano
 Quore (2002)
 It Can't Be All Our Fault (2003) - Butler
 Household Accounts (2003) - Magistrato anziano
 Andata e ritorno (2003) - Capo di Samuele
 Red Riding Hood (2003) - Francesco Scura
 Agata and the Storm (2004) - Generoso Rambone
 Ladri di barzellette (2004)
 Sara May (2004) - Usciere Cinecittà
 La bambina dalle mani sporche (2005) - Notaio
 Nemici per la pelle (2006) - Satana
 Shooting Silvio (2006)
 Segretario particolare (2007) - Amico di Mattia
 Nero bifamiliare (2007) - Colonnello Piacentini
 La canarina assassinata (2008) - Director
 Il prossimo tuo (2008) - Bit part (uncredited)
 La strategia degli affetti (2009) - Goffredo
 Palestrina - Prince of Music (2009) - Filippo Neri
 Nine (2009) - Cardinal
 Letters to Juliet (2010) - Farm House Lorenzo
 Eat Pray Love (2010) - Older Soccer Fan
 The Santa Claus Gang (2010) - Barbone
 Escort in Love (2011) - Poeta
 Buona giornata (2012) - Vecchio funerale
 Viva l'Italia (2012) - Annibale
 Buongiorno papà (2013) - Guardone
 Ganja Fiction (2013) - Himself
 Professione Remotti (2016) - Himself (final film role)

References

External links 

1924 births
2015 deaths
Italian male stage actors
Italian male film actors
Italian male television actors
Male actors from Rome
20th-century Italian male actors
Italian dramatists and playwrights
Sonneteers
20th-century Italian painters
Italian male painters
21st-century Italian painters
20th-century Italian sculptors
20th-century Italian male artists
Italian male sculptors
20th-century Italian poets
20th-century Italian dramatists and playwrights
Writers from Rome
Italian expatriates in Peru
21st-century Italian male artists